Samuel Olubayu Sowale is an Anglican bishop in Nigeria:  he is the current Bishop of Ilesa.

Sowale was born in 1951 at Isara-Remo and educated at  the University of Ibadan and the University of British Columbia.  He  was ordained a deacon in 1977 and a priest a year later. He became canon in 1987, archdeacon in 1992, provost in 1993 and was elected and consecrated Bishop of Ilesa in 2000.

Notes

University of Ibadan alumni
University of British Columbia alumni
People from Ogun State
Living people
Anglican bishops of Ilesa
21st-century Anglican bishops in Nigeria
Anglican provosts in Africa
Church of Nigeria archdeacons
1951 births